Marigot Bay is located on the western coast of the Caribbean island country of Saint Lucia, 3.75 miles southwest from Castries and a short distance from the Saint Lucian National Marine Reserve. It is surrounded on three sides by steep, forested hills.

History
The inland portion of the bay forms a hurricane hole, used to shelter boats from hurricanes.

Marigot Bay is a historic landmark, having been the site of a number of battles between the French and British navies.

The bay was used as the setting for the 1967 film adaptation of Hugh Lofting's Doctor Dolittle books. Scenes of the shipwreck, Great Pink Sea Snail, and the construction of the harness for the Giant Lunar Moth were filmed in the bay.

The American novelist James A. Michener, in his 1978 novel Chesapeake, famously described the bay as "The most beautiful bay in the Caribbean".

The all-girl trio Arabesque featured a song "Marigot Bay" appearing on the album of the same name in 1980.

Region

The second-order administrative region of Castries District is called Marigot and has a population of 769.  The populated towns within this region are Marigot and Marigot Bay.  The water body is referred to as Marigot Harbor.  There is also a Marigot Point.

Gallery

References

Bays of Saint Lucia